Ty Cobb (born 1975) is an American politician who served in the Nevada Assembly from the 26th district from 2006 to 2010.

References

1975 births
Living people
Republican Party members of the Nevada Assembly
21st-century American politicians